Jelena Jovanović may refer to:
 Jelena Jovanović (basketball)
 Jelena Jovanović (ethnomusicologist)
 Jelena Jovanović (politician)